The 13th constituency of Budapest is one of the single member constituencies of the National Assembly, the national legislature of Hungary. The constituency standard abbreviation: Budapest 13. OEVK.

Since 2014, it has been represented by Kristóf Szatmáry of the Fidesz–KDNP party alliance.

Geography
The 13th constituency is located in north-eastern part of Pest.

List of districts
The constituency includes the following municipalities:

 District XVI.: Full part of the district.
 District XIV.: Eastern part (Rákosfalva, Alsórákos) of the district.

Members
The constituency was first represented by Kristóf Szatmáry of the Fidesz from 2014, and he was re-elected in 2018.

References

Budapest 13th